Polybasite is a sulfosalt mineral of silver, copper, antimony and arsenic.

It forms black monoclinic crystals (thin, tabular, with six corners) which can show dark red internal reflections.  It has a Mohs hardness of 2.5 to 3. It is found worldwide and is an ore of silver. The name comes from the number of base metals in the mineral.

Images

References

 
Silver minerals
Copper(I) minerals
Antimony minerals
Arsenic minerals
Sulfosalt minerals
Monoclinic minerals
Minerals in space group 15